Dompierre-sur-Authie (literally Dompierre on Authie) is a commune in the Somme department in Hauts-de-France in northern France.

It is slowly depopulating like most of the countryside towns of this region, with the last shop and last hairdresser in the village having closed in the 1990s. Nevertheless, there is a strong identity and social life in the town, which retains its own primary school.

Geography
The railway line, part of the Réseau des Bains de Mer system opened on 19 June 1892 and closed on  10 March 1947. Dompierre-sur-Authie was the northern terminus of the branch from Abbeville. The station is still standing and recognisable as such, though it is now a private dwelling.

History
There are two buildings in the town which are described as chateaux. The town is mentioned (though its name is misspelled) in the Appendix of Heinz Guderian's memoirs 'Panzer Leader', and it is clear that Guderian moved his units through Dompierre on 22 May 1940 and briefly had his HQ stationed there when moving from Abbeville in the direction of Montreuil-sur-Mer.

Population

See also
Communes of the Somme department
Réseau des Bains de Mer
Chemin de Fer de la Baie de Somme

References

Communes of Somme (department)